USS Cushing may refer to one of several United States Navy ships named in honor of William B. Cushing:

 , a torpedo boat (the first) commissioned in 1890, and served until her decommissioning in 1898
 , an  commissioned 1915 and decommissioned in 1920

References

United States Navy ship names